Osorezan no Stooges Kyo is an album by Boredoms, released in 1988 on Selfish Records. The title translates to "The Stooges' Craze in Osorezan".

Critical reception
Trouser Press wrote that "structure-free sonic whirlwinds like 'Call Me God' and 'Feedbackfuck' are simultaneously far funnier than any quirk-rock smirk-fest you'd care to name and far scarier than any death-metal posing in recent memory."

Track listing
"Wipe Out Shock Shoppers" – 0:21
"Boredom, Vs, Sdi" – 3:23
"We Never Sleep" – 2:10
"Bite My Bollocks" – 2:24
"Young Assouls" – 6:03
"Call Me God" – 3:18
"No Core Punk" – 1:11
"Lick'n Cock Boatpeople" – 5:11
"Melt Down Boogie" – 4:50
"Feedbackfuck" – 6:33

References

1988 albums
Boredoms albums